The Autonomous Socialist Party (PSA) was a far-left political party in Switzerland, based in the canton of Ticino.

History
The PSA was established in 1966; its founders were former members from the Social Democratic Party who had been expelled for their far-left views. It failed to win a seat in the National Council in the 1971 federal elections, but in the 1975 elections it ran in Ticino in alliance with the Progressive Organizations of Switzerland (POCH), with Werner Carobbio winning one seat. It continued its alliance with POCH for the 1979 elections, retaining its single seat. It retained the seat again in the 1983 and 1987. It was renamed Unitarian Socialist Party in 1988, The PSA was well represented in the Grand Council of Ticino, maintaining between six and nine seats in the legislature (of ninety) constantly between 1971 and 1991. After retaining its seat again in 1991, it merged back into the Social Democratic Party in 1992.

Election history

National Council

Grand Council of Ticino

Notable members
Werner Carobbio
Pietro Martinelli

References

Defunct communist parties in Switzerland
Political parties established in 1966
1966 establishments in Switzerland
Political parties disestablished in 1992
1992 disestablishments in Switzerland